Koerner House may refer to:

Koerner House (Palm Springs, California)
Koerner House (Spokane, Washington)